Romina Natalia Maggi (born 27 March 1976 in Rosario, Santa Fe) is an Argentine athlete who specialises in the javelin throw. She represented her country at the 2004 Summer Olympics failing to qualify for the final.

Her personal best of  56.18 metres, set in 2004, is the standing national record.

Competition record

References

1976 births
Living people
Argentine female javelin throwers
Sportspeople from Rosario, Santa Fe
Athletes (track and field) at the 2004 Summer Olympics
Olympic athletes of Argentina